"More, More, More" is a 1976 disco song by the Andrea True Connection.

More, More, More may also refer to:

Music
 More, More, More (Andrea True Connection album), album by the Andrea True Connection
 More! More! More!, an album by Capsule, or the title song
 "More, More, More" (Carmel song)
 "More, More, More", a song by Kylie Minogue from Fever

Other uses
 More, More, More, 2007 short film by Blake Ritson
 More More More, a 2003 manga graphic novel by Kazumi Kazui

See also
 More & More, an extended play by South Korean girl group Twice
 More (disambiguation)